Pandemic: How to Prevent an Outbreak is a 2020 American documentary series about pandemics. It was released on Netflix on January 22, 2020. The series covers a range of issues such as the possibility of an influenza pandemic,  research into achieving a universal vaccine, emerging viruses, anti-vaxxers, and the Ebola outbreak in Africa. It features several notable health and science experts, including Syra Madad, Ron Klain, and Raghu Sharma. It has attracted particular media attention due to being released in the midst of the COVID-19 pandemic.

Reception
Brigid Delaney of The Guardian found the "eerily timed" series "informative, inspiring, visually stunning and a great piece of storytelling". She was also "moved to tears multiple times" by the "kindness and dedication of those who work in the field". James Jackson of The Times thought the coronavirus outbreak "gives an extra reason to watch what's a valuable six-parter underpinned by strong storytelling as it follows doctors risking their lives in contagious conditions", giving it four stars out of five. Brad Newsome of The Sydney Morning Herald found the series compelling initially when it covers how doctors and public health officials deal with the seasonal flu, but less so "as the series broadens its focus" and "begins to slow".

Episodes

References

External links
 
  
 Pandemic: How to Prevent an Outbreak on Rotten Tomatoes

2020 American television series debuts
2020 American television series endings
2020s American documentary television series
English-language Netflix original programming
Netflix original documentary television series
Television series about viral outbreaks
Television shows about influenza outbreaks